Elke Heine (born 9 January 1967) is a German gymnast. She competed in six events at the 1984 Summer Olympics.

References

1967 births
Living people
German female artistic gymnasts
Olympic gymnasts of West Germany
Gymnasts at the 1984 Summer Olympics
Sportspeople from Hanover